Valluri Srinivasa Rao (born 20 October 1981) is an Indian weightlifter from Andhra Pradesh. He works in the Corps of Electronic and Mechanical Engineering of the Indian Army.

Career
On 25 October 2003, in the 2003 Afro-Asian Games held in Hyderabad, India, Rao won a silver medal in the Men's 56 kg category. He won a gold medal in the Commonwealth Weightlifting Championships held in Penang, Malaysia in October 2009 in the same category.

On 4 October 2010 Rao won a bronze medal in the 2010 Commonwealth Games in Delhi in the Men's 56 kg category. On 13 November 2010, he ranked 8th in the 2010 Asian Games in Guangzhou in the Men's 56 kg category.

On 22 February 2011, Rao won a gold medal in the Men's 56 kg category of the 34th National Games in Jamshedpur. He represented the Services (SSCB) team in the event.

References

Indian male weightlifters
1981 births
Weightlifters from Andhra Pradesh
Commonwealth Games bronze medallists for India
Living people
Commonwealth Games medallists in weightlifting
Weightlifters at the 2010 Asian Games
Weightlifters at the 2010 Commonwealth Games
Asian Games competitors for India
20th-century Indian people
21st-century Indian people
Medallists at the 2010 Commonwealth Games